G Vidyaraj is a retired gem collector who supposedly owns some of the largest gems in the world, including the Rajaratna ruby and the Neelanjali Ruby. It is claimed that he is a direct descendant of the rulers of the Vijayanagar raja of Hampi in Karnataka, which is where he claims the rubies originate from.

References

Year of birth missing (living people)
Living people
Indian collectors